Graptopetalum amethystinum, also called jewel-leaf plant, is a plant belonging to the succulent genus Graptopetalum. It is native to Mexico.

References

External links

 IPNI Listing
 Kew Plant List

amethystinum
Endemic flora of Mexico
Garden plants of North America
Drought-tolerant plants
Plants described in 1905